Hector "Hec" Denis Hogan (15 July 1931, Rockhampton2 September 1960, Brisbane) was an Australian athlete who competed mainly in the 100 yards and 100 metres sprint, where he was seven-times Australian 100 yards champion. He also competed in the 220 yards/200 metres, which he won twice in the Australian Championships, and the long jump which he won in 1954. He also competed in the triple jump.

In March 1954, he equalled the world record for the 100 yards (9.3 seconds) and 100 metres (10.2 seconds) on a grass track in Sydney. He won bronze medals in the 100 yards and 4 × 100 yards relay at the 1954 Commonwealth Games in Vancouver. His time for the 100 yards was 9.7 seconds. In the 1958 Commonwealth Games at Cardiff he won a bronze for the 4 × 100 yards relay.

He competed for Australia in the 1956 Summer Olympics held in Melbourne, where he won the bronze medal in the 100 metres.

Hogan died on 2 September 1960 of leukaemia, leaving his wife, Maureen, and a son. He was buried in Nudgee Cemetery.

References

External links

Official Commonwealth Games site

1931 births
1960 deaths
Australian male long jumpers
Australian male sprinters
Olympic bronze medalists for Australia
Athletes (track and field) at the 1956 Summer Olympics
Olympic athletes of Australia
Athletes (track and field) at the 1954 British Empire and Commonwealth Games
Athletes (track and field) at the 1958 British Empire and Commonwealth Games
Commonwealth Games bronze medallists for Australia
Deaths from leukemia
Deaths from cancer in Queensland
Commonwealth Games medallists in athletics
Burials at Nudgee Cemetery
Medalists at the 1956 Summer Olympics
Olympic bronze medalists in athletics (track and field)
Sport Australia Hall of Fame inductees
Medallists at the 1954 British Empire and Commonwealth Games
Medallists at the 1958 British Empire and Commonwealth Games